Phillip S. Ruggiero (March 24, 1928 – November 7, 2003) was a Democratic member of the Pennsylvania House of Representatives.
 He was born in Washington Township, Northampton County.

He died in 2003 at a hospital. He had previously resided in a nursing home.

References

Democratic Party members of the Pennsylvania House of Representatives
1928 births
2003 deaths
20th-century American politicians